An omphalos is a type of ancient religious stone artifact; its name comes from the Greek for "navel".

Omphalos may also refer to:
 Omphalos Stone, a stone in Greek mythology
 Omphalos (book), by Philip Gosse
 Omphalos (story), by Ted Chiang
 Omphalos hypothesis, which proposes that God made the world appear old when he created it
 Omphalos (sculpture), a sculpture in southern Sweden, named after the Omphalos in Delphi
 Omphalos (film)
 Omfalos, a sculpture in Sweden